Ive (stylized as IVE) is a South Korean girl group formed by Starship Entertainment. The group is composed of six members: Gaeul, Yujin, Rei, Wonyoung, Liz and Leeseo. They made their debut on December 1, 2021, with the single album Eleven.

Name

The group's name, Ive, is a contraction for "I have". It alludes to the idea of showing what "I have" to the audience with confidence, where instead of telling the story of growth, the group tries to portray a "complete girl group" from the start.

Career

2018–2021: Pre-debut activities
Wonyoung and Yujin participated in the reality competition series Produce 48 in 2018. Wonyoung finished in first place and Yujin finished in fifth place, respectively, becoming members of the project girl group Iz*One. They promoted with the group until its disbandment on April 29, 2021.

2021: Introduction and debut with Eleven
On November 2, Starship Entertainment announced that they would be debuting a new girl group, their first since WJSN in 2016. The members were revealed from November 3 to 8 (in order: Yujin, Gaeul, Wonyoung, Liz, Rei, and Leeseo). On November 8, Starship confirmed that the group would debut on December 1, followed two days later by the announcement of the title of the group's first single album as Eleven. On December 1, the group released their debut single album, Eleven, led by the single of the same name. The group made their broadcast debut on KBS2's Music Bank on December 3, performing "Eleven".

On the Billboard charts dated the week of December 14, "Eleven" ranked at number nine on the World Digital Song Sales chart and charted on the Billboard Global 200 and Billboard Global Excl. US charts for fourteen consecutive weeks. The song also topped Billboard's Hot Trending Songs chart, debuting atop the Top User Generated Songs chart of Billboard Japan, and entered the Japan Hot 100 chart. Meanwhile, Ive charted on the Billboard Artist 100 for the first time.

On December 8, exactly one week after their debut, Ive earned their first music show win on MBC M's Show Champion, making them the fastest girl group to win first place since debut. "Eleven" went on to win on music shows 13 times, including a triple crown on KBS2's Music Bank, MBC's Music Core, and SBS' Inkigayo. In addition, Eleven recorded the most album sales in its first week of release for girl group debut albums. The music video for "Eleven" surpassed 100 million views on March 8, 2022.

2022: Love Dive, After Like and Japanese debut

On April 5, Ive released their second single album, Love Dive, led by the single of the same name. One week after release, the song went viral and reached 200M views for its TikTok challenge. The single also drew 28.9 million streams and sold 2,800 outside the U.S. in its first full tracking week. On the Billboard chart dated April 23, "Love Dive" ascended to number 10 on the Global Excl. US chart, becoming the group's first song to reach the top 10. The music video for "Love Dive" surpassed 100 million views on June 15.

On July 18, Starship Entertainment announced that Ive would make a comeback in August with their third single album, After Like. It was released alongside the lead single of the same name on August 22.

On August 10, it was announced via Ive's official Japanese website that they will make their Japanese debut sometime in fall 2022. On September 8, it was announced that Ive would be releasing the  Japanese version of "Eleven" on October 19.

On November 16, Ive participated in Spotify's annual "Spotify Holiday Single", which consists of project songs presented by various artists directly selected by Spotify ahead of the year-end Christmas season. Ive is the first Korean group artist to participate in the annual Holiday Singles project, reinterpreting their third single title song "After Like", released in August, as a new holiday remix version and exclusively releasing it on Spotify worldwide.

On January 16, 2023, Ive released their second Japanese single "Love Dive", a re-recording of their Korean single of the same name.

On March 16, it was announced that Ive would be releasing their first studio album, I've Ive, on April 10.

Other ventures

Ambassadorship
In September 2022, Ive was appointed as ambassador for the Korean Red Cross' annual "Everyone Campaign" to promote volunteering.

Endorsements
In August 2022, Ive appeared as a model for SK Telecom's "V Coloring," a subscription-based video ringback tone service. In January 2023, Ive was selected as model for the "2023 Pepsi Project," a collaboration between Starship Entertainment and Pepsi. On January 21, 2023, Ive has been selected as new model for Papa John's Pizza.

Philanthropy
On February 14, 2023, Ive and Starship Entertainment donated ₩150 million for emergency relief efforts towards the earthquakes in Turkey and Syria.

Influences and impact
In January 2022, Ive was selected as the most anticipated K-pop artist of the year by 31 of the most popular music agency experts from different entertainment companies.

In November 2022, as part of its 18th year of publication, JoyNews24 conducted a survey on 200 entertainment industry officials to determine the "Artist of the Year," for which Ive ranked first on the list. In the same month, Shibuya109 Lab, which is a youth marketing institute run by Shibuya109 Entertainment in Japan, conducted a survey with a report titled "Next Generation K-Pop Idols" for women age 15 to 24 years old. Ive took first place in the list, mentioning the attention for their song, fashion, and pose.

In December 2022, Ive was selected as "Best Singer of the Year" and placed second for "Rookie of the Year" by executives of 33 pop music officials from various entertainment companies. In the same month, Zsouken Research Institute conducted a survey for the second half of 2022 on who are the most popular artists in Japan for Generation Z, in which Ive ranked at number five, the highest act outside Japan, garnering 12.3% of votes among 120,000 participants.

Members

 Yujin – leader, dancer, vocalist
 Gaeul – dancer, rapper
 Rei – rapper, vocalist
 Wonyoung – vocalist
 Liz – vocalist
 Leeseo – vocalist

Discography

Studio albums

Single albums

Singles

Other charted songs

Videography

Music videos

Other videos

Filmography

Reality shows

Awards and nominations

Notes

References

External links
  
  

Ive (group)
Starship Entertainment artists
Ki/oon Music artists
2021 establishments in South Korea
K-pop music groups
Musical groups established in 2021
Musical groups from Seoul
South Korean girl groups